The Sugarhill Gang is an American hip hop duo, originally a trio. Their 1979 hit "Rapper's Delight" was the first rap single to become a top 40 hit on the Billboard Hot 100; reaching a peak position of number 36 on January 12, 1980. This was the trio's only U.S. hit, though they did have further success in Europe until the mid-1980s. The trio reformed in 1994 and did a world tour in 2016.

Formation and early years
The members, all from Englewood, New Jersey, consisted of Michael "Wonder Mike" Wright, Henry "Big Bank Hank" Jackson, and Guy "Master Gee" O'Brien. The three were assembled into a group by producer Sylvia Robinson, who founded Sugar Hill Records with her husband, record producer Joe Robinson. The group and the record company were named after the Sugar Hill, Harlem, neighborhood.

Their 1979 hit "Rapper's Delight" was the first rap single to become a top 40 hit on the Billboard Hot 100. The group never had another U.S. hit, though it had multiple European hits, such as "Apache", "8th Wonder" (which was performed on the American music show Soul Train in 1981), "Rapper's Reprise (Jam Jam)", and "Showdown" (with the Furious Five). The trio wound down  over the next five years and disbanded in 1985.

Later years

In 1999, the trio reunited and recorded Jump on It! a hip hop children's album.

After Wonder Mike and Hen Dogg left Sugarhill Records in 2005, the original members of Sugarhill Gang (besides Jackson) have performed as the Original Sugar and as Rapper's Delight Featuring Wonder Mike and Master Gee. This is largely due to a string of legal cases against them regarding the use of 'Sugarhill Gang' as their name.

On November 11, 2014, Big Bank Hank died at the age of 58 after a long battle with cancer.

In 2016, the remaining living members of the original Sugarhill Gang, including Wonder Mike, Hen Dogg and Master Gee embarked on their first world tour in over a decade under the name The Sugarhill Gang. During this, they performed as the Sugarhill Gang for the Art of Rap festival tour in 2016, and at V Festival in Hylands Park and Weston Park in the UK as part of their world tour in 2016. Other places included, the Clockenflap Festival in Hong Kong on November 27, 2016, and they headlined at the Depot in the Park Festival in Cardiff, United Kingdom on August 5, 2017. In July 2019 they played the North Nibley Festival in Gloucestershire.

In 2019, the Sugarhill Gang celebrated the 40th anniversary of the release of "Rapper's Delight" and the group's formation. They went on a worldwide tour called Rapper's Delight 40th Anniversary World Tour. The gang made new music in early 2019. The tour lasted from May 24 to July 26, 2019. They are still going on tours to this day despite the COVID-19 pandemic.

On October 25, 2019, the group performed "Rapper's Delight" on Jimmy Kimmel Live!.

Discography

The discography of the Sugarhill Gang includes five studio albums, nine compilations and fifteen singles.

Studio albums

Compilation albums
 Sugarhill Gang Greatest Hits (1984)
 Boyz from Da Hill (1994)
 Ain't Nothin' but a Party (1998)
 Hip Hop Anniversary Europe Tour: Sugarhill Gang Live (2008)

Singles

See also
 List of 1970s one-hit wonders in the United States

References

External links

 Sugarhill Gang playlist on WaveCat
 "I Want My Name Back" documentary on the Sugar Hill Gang, Featuring Master Gee and Wonder Mike
 Master Gee interview
 The Sugarhill Gang - Rapper's Delight (Official Video)

East Coast hip hop groups
Rappers from New Jersey
African-American musical groups
1979 establishments in New Jersey
Musical groups established in 1979
American musical trios
Musical groups from New Jersey
Hansa Records artists
Sugar Hill Records (hip hop label) artists